"Baby, I Believe in You (The Love Mix)" is the third single from New Kids on the Block's No More Games/The Remix Album. The lead vocals were sung by Jordan Knight. The Maurice Starr-penned tune was released in Germany on October 22, 1991, but did not chart. The song was played again in the 2008 New Kids on the Block reunion tour.

A year after the NKOTB version was first released, freestyle star George Lamond recorded a cover version for his 1992 album, In My Life that was also released as a single and peaked number 66 on the Billboard Hot 100.

Charts

References

1991 singles
New Kids on the Block songs
Songs written by Maurice Starr
1990 songs